Giant Magnolias on a Blue Velvet Cloth (1890) is an oil on canvas still life by Martin Johnson Heade acquired by the National Gallery of Art in 1982. Heade made significant contributions to floral still-life painting during the course of his career, the NGA points out, with Giant Magnolias being one of the finest. Heade married in 1883 and settled in St. Augustine, Florida after a lackluster career as an itinerant artist. He was patronized by Floridian Henry Morrison Flagler, an oil and railroad magnate, who regularly purchased his works. The NGA believes this personal and professional stability stimulated the production of the still-life paintings of Heade's last years.

The NGA writes, "Certainly works such as Giant Magnolias on a Blue Velvet Cloth, with their striking contrasts of brilliantly lit flowers and leaves set against a dark background, are among the most original still lifes of the nineteenth century. They are also for many observers strongly sensual, their lush colors, full, curving contours, overall sense of opulence, and implied perfumed scent of the flowers suggestive, perhaps, of female nudes languidly reclining on luxurious couches."

References 
 NGA: Giant Magnolias on a Blue Velvet Cloth

Paintings by Martin Johnson Heade
1890 paintings
Collections of the National Gallery of Art
Still life paintings
Flower paintings